The 8th Naples Grand Prix was a motor race, run to Formula One rules, held on 8 May 1955 at Posillipo Circuit, Naples. The race was run over 60 laps of the circuit, and was won by Italian driver Alberto Ascari in a Lancia D50.

Results

References

Naples Grand Prix
Grand Prix of Naples